Washington Curran Whitthorne (April 19, 1825September 21, 1891) was a Tennessee attorney, Democratic politician, and an Adjutant General in the Confederate Army.

Early life and career
Whitthorne was born near Petersburg, Tennessee in Marshall County. One day when Whitthorne was young James K. Polk stayed at his family's home. Polk saw how bright he was and asked, "What are you going to make of this boy?" His father replied "I am going to make him the President of the United States." Polk then told them to send the boy to Columbia and he would make him a lawyer. He attended Campbell Academy in Lebanon, Tennessee and subsequently  East Tennessee College (now the University of Tennessee) where he graduated in 1843. He subsequently studied law and was admitted to the bar in 1845, serving in various governmental positions, and working for James K. Polk until he entered private practice in 1848 in Columbia, Tennessee. He owned slaves. On July 4, 1848 Whitthorne married Matilda Jane Campbell, a cousin of Polk.

He was elected to serve in the Tennessee State Senate from 1855 to 1858. Whitthorne was then elected Speaker of the Tennessee House of Representatives from 1859 to 1861.

Civil War service
In 1861 he became Adjutant General of Tennessee for the Confederacy, and served in that post through the end of the Civil War. He also served on the staff of generals Robert Anderson, Marcus Joseph Wright, Samuel P. Carter, and William J. Hardee.

Postbellum career
After Lee had surrendered at Appomattox, Whitthorne was held as prisoner of war at Columbia in order to be shielded from Federal prosecution.  President Andrew Johnson interceded, gave him a Presidential pardon, and restored his civil rights.  In 1870, Whitthorne began a campaign for the United States House of Representatives.  He won the election and would eventually serve six consecutive terms during his initial service in the House of Representatives, chairing the House Committee on Naval Affairs from 1875 to 1881.

Upon the resignation of Senator Howell E. Jackson, Whitthorne was appointed to the U.S. Senate by governor of Tennessee William B. Bate and then subsequently elected to the balance of the term by the Tennessee General Assembly, serving in the Senate from April 16, 1886 to March 3, 1887.  Following his Senate service he served two more subsequent consecutive terms in the United States House of Representatives, from 1887 to 1891.  After serving in the House of Representatives Whitthorne returned to Columbia and died there later in 1891, being interred at Rose Hill Cemetery.  Whitthorne Middle School in Columbia, formerly Whitthorne Junior High School, is named in his honor.

See also

References
Bar Association of Tennessee's; Proceedings of the ... Annual Session of the Bar Association of Tennessee, The Association, (1905)
The National Cyclopaedia of American Biography: Being the History of the United States as Illustrated in the Lives of the Founders, Builders, and Defenders of the Republic, and of the Men and Women who are Doing the Work and Moulding the Thought of the Present Time, J. T. White company, (1900)
 United States Congress, W. H. Michael; Official Congressional Directory (1890)

References

1825 births
1891 deaths
People from Marshall County, Tennessee
American people of Irish descent
Democratic Party members of the United States House of Representatives from Tennessee
Democratic Party United States senators from Tennessee
Democratic Party members of the Tennessee House of Representatives
Democratic Party Tennessee state senators
Tennessee lawyers
American slave owners
Confederate States Army generals
People of Tennessee in the American Civil War
19th-century American politicians
United States senators who owned slaves